Hildegardia is a genus of insect, belonging to the family Tetrigidae and subfamily of Metrodorinae.

The known species of this genus are found in Mauritius and La Réunion.

Species
Hildegardia mauritiicola  Günther, 1974 - (Mauritius)
Hildegardia mauritiivaga  Günther, 1974 - (Mauritius)
Hildegardia reuniivaga  Hugel, 2007 - (Réunion)

References

Moths of Mauritius
Moths of Réunion
Tetrigidae